Hedley may refer to:

 Hedley, British Columbia, Canada, an unincorporated town
 Hedley, Texas, United States, a city
 Hedley railway station, South Gippsland, Victoria, Australia
 Hedley (band), a Canadian pop-rock band formed in 2003 and named after the BC town
 Hedley (album), their self-titled debut album
 Hedley (surname), a list of people and fictional characters
 Hedley (given name), a list of people and fictional characters

See also
 Hedley on the Hill, Northumberland 
 Hedley Hill, county Durham
Hadleigh (disambiguation)
Hadley (disambiguation)
Headley (disambiguation)